Hector Perez may refer to:
 Héctor Pérez (baseball), Dominican baseball pitcher
 Hector Perez, National Commissioner of the Boy Scouts of America.
 Héctor Pérez (cyclist) (born 1959), Mexican cyclist
 Héctor Pérez, founder of the Spanish Internet Party political party
 Héctor Pérez, midfielder for the Venezuelan Atlético Venezuela soccer team, 2009
 Héctor Pérez, goalkeeper for the Brazilian Iberia Los Ángeles soccer team, 2011
 Héctor Pérez, cyclist representing Andorra at the 1988 Summer Olympics 
 Héctor Amodio Pérez, Uruguayan guerrilla fighter
 Héctor Pérez (footballer, born 1983), Paraguayan soccer player
 Héctor Pérez (footballer, born 1991), Venezuelan football goalkeeper
 Héctor Rivera Pérez (born 1933), Auxiliary Bishop Emeritus of San Juan, 1979–2009
 Israel Héctor Perez (born 1979), featherweight boxer from Argentina